Two for the Show may refer to:

 Two for the Show (musical), a 1940 Broadway musical
 Two for the Show (Jack Greene and Jeannie Seely album), 1972
 Two for the Show (Trooper album), 1976
 Two for the Show (Kansas album), 1978
 Two for the Show (David Friesen album), 1994